This pages lists people elected ISCB Fellow by the International Society for Computational Biology (ISCB).

Class of 2009
 David Haussler
 David Lipman
 Webb Miller
 David Sankoff
 Temple F. Smith
 Janet Thornton
 Michael Waterman

Class of 2010
 Russ Altman
 Lawrence Hunter
 Eugene Myers
 Chris Sander
 Gary Stormo
 Alfonso Valencia

Class of 2011
 Michael Ashburner
 Philip E. Bourne
 Søren Brunak
 Richard Durbin

Class of 2012
 Bonnie Berger
 Peter Karp
 Jill Mesirov
 Pavel Pevzner
 Ron Shamir
 Martin Vingron
 Gunnar von Heijne

Class of 2013
 Pierre Baldi
 David Eisenberg
 Minoru Kanehisa
 Satoru Miyano
 Ruth Nussinov
 Steven Salzberg

Class of 2014
 Amos Bairoch
 Ewan Birney
 Nir Friedman
 Robert Gentleman
 Andrej Sali

Class of 2015
 Rolf Apweiler
 Cyrus Chothia
 Julio Collado-Vides
 Mark Gerstein
 Des Higgins
 Thomas Lengauer
 Michael Levitt
 Burkhard Rost

Class of 2016
 Helen M. Berman
 Steven E. Brenner
 Dan Gusfield
 Barry Honig
 Janet Kelso
 Michal Linial
 Christine Orengo
 Aviv Regev
 Lincoln Stein
 Sarah Teichmann
 Anna Tramontano
 Shoshana Wodak
 Haim Wolfson

Class of 2017
 Alex Bateman
 Andrea Califano
 Daphne Koller
 Anders Krogh
 William S. Noble
 Lior Pachter
 Olga Troyanskaya
 Tandy Warnow

Class of 2018 

 Patricia Babbitt
 Terry Gaasterland
 Hanah Margalit
 Yves Moreau
 Bernard Moret
 William Pearson
 Mona Singh
 Mike Steel

Class of 2019 

Vineet Bafna
Eleazar Eskin
Xiaole Shirley Liu
Marie-France Sagot

Class of 2020 

Serafim Batzoglou
Judith Blake
Mark Borodovsky
Rita Casadio
Paul Flicek
Osamu Gotoh
Rafael Irizarry
Laxmi Parida
Katherine Pollard
Ben Raphael
Zhiping Weng
Xuegong Zhang

Class of 2021 

Atul Butte
A. Keith Dunker
Eran Halperin
Wolfgang Huber
Sorin Istrail
Christina Leslie
Ming Li
Núria López Bigas
Dana Pe'er
Teresa Przytycka
Eytan Ruppin
Gustavo Stolovitzky

Class of 2022 

Barbara Bryant
Sean Eddy
Mikhail Gelfand
Takashi Gojobori
Trey Ideker
David Tudor Jones
Fran Lewitter
Jun Liu
Debora Marks
Mihai Pop
Reinhard Schneider

References